Zinc finger protein 423 is a protein that in humans is encoded by the ZNF423 gene.

The protein encoded by this gene is a nuclear protein that belongs to the family of Kruppel-like C2H2 zinc finger proteins. It functions as a DNA-binding transcription factor by using distinct zinc fingers in different signaling pathways. Thus, it is thought that this gene may have multiple roles in signal transduction during development. Mice lacking the homologous gene Zfp423 have defects in midline brain development, especially in the cerebellum, as well as defects in olfactory development, and adipogenesis. Patients with mutations in ZNF423 have been reported in Joubert Syndrome and nephronophthisis.

Interactions 

ZNF423 has been shown to interact with EBF1, PARP1, Notch intracellular domain, retinoic acid receptor, and CEP290.

References

Further reading

External links 

Transcription factors